Gordon Conway (December 18, 1894 – June 9, 1956) was an illustrator and costume designer who designed for British films in the 1920s and 1930s. Notable films included High Treason (1929), Sunshine Susie (1931) and The Good Companions (1933). She worked closely with leading film producer Michael Balcon, and is credited with establishing the first specialist costume department in Britain's film studios in the early 1930s. Conway was buried in Oakland Cemetery in Dallas, Texas.

References

Further reading

External links 
 Collection of Conway's papers at the Harry Ransom Center

Costume designers
1894 births
1956 deaths
Women costume designers
Place of birth missing
Place of death missing
Nationality missing